Jassa marmorata is a species of tube-building amphipod. It is native to the northeast Atlantic Ocean but has been introduced into northeast Asia. J. marmorata are greyish in colour with reddish brown markings. They are generally found in fouling communities and intertidal areas where they build tubes of detritus and algae fragments using silky mucus secretions. They are remarkable for having two distinct morphs of males with two different mating strategies. The 'major' morphs are fighter males, while the 'minor' morphs are sneaker males.

J. marmorata is classified under the genus Jassa of the family Ischyroceridae. They are commonly confused with the closely related scud (Jassa falcata).

References

Corophiidea
Crustaceans of the Atlantic Ocean
Crustaceans described in 1905